The canton of Vic-sur-Cère is an administrative division of the Cantal department, southern France. Its borders were modified at the French canton reorganisation which came into effect in March 2015. Its seat is in Vic-sur-Cère.

It consists of the following communes:
 
Badailhac
Carlat
Cros-de-Ronesque
Giou-de-Mamou
Jou-sous-Monjou
Labrousse
Lascelle
Mandailles-Saint-Julien
Pailherols
Polminhac
Raulhac
Saint-Cirgues-de-Jordanne
Saint-Clément
Saint-Étienne-de-Carlat
Saint-Jacques-des-Blats
Saint-Simon
Teissières-lès-Bouliès
Thiézac
Velzic
Vézac
Vezels-Roussy
Vic-sur-Cère
Yolet

References

Cantons of Cantal